Patalene is a genus of moths in the family Geometridae erected by Gottlieb August Wilhelm Herrich-Schäffer in 1854.

Species
Patalene asychisaria (Walker, 1860)
Patalene chaonia (Druce, 1887)
Patalene dissimilis (Schaus, 1901)
Patalene ephyrata (Guenée, [1858])
Patalene epionata Guenée, 1857)
Patalene falcularia Herrich-Schäffer, [1854]
Patalene luciata (Stoll, [1790])
Patalene olyzonaria (Walker, 1860)
Patalene nicoaria (Walker, 1860)
Patalene quatuormaculata (Verloren, 1837)
Patalene trogonaria (Herrich-Schäffer, [1856])
Patalene virgultaria (Felder & Rogenhofer, 1875)

References

Ourapterygini